The maize weevil (Sitophilus zeamais), known in the United States as the greater rice weevil, is a species of beetle in the family Curculionidae. It can be found in numerous tropical areas around the world, and in the United States, and is a major pest of maize. This species attacks both standing crops and stored cereal products, including wheat, rice, sorghum, oats, barley, rye, buckwheat, peas, and cottonseed. The maize weevil also infests other types of stored, processed cereal products such as pasta, cassava, and various coarse, milled grains. It has even been known to attack fruit while in storage, such as apples.

Description

A close relative of the rice weevil, the maize weevil has a length of 2.3 mm to 4.9 mm. The type of food consumed by the larvae influences the size of the adult (3.9-4.9 mm on corn, 3.0-4.6 mm on wheat, 2.9-4.3 mm on rice, 2.7-3.2 on rough rice, and 2.3-3.9 mm on shelled rice). This small, brown weevil has four reddish-brown spots on the wing covers (elytra). It has a long, thin snout, and geniculate (elbowed) antennae. Sitophilus zeamais appears similar to the rice weevil (Sitophilus oryzae), but has more clearly marked spots on the wing covers, and is usually somewhat larger. It is able to fly.

The maize weevil and the rice weevil look very much alike but external features can be used to differentiate the vast majority of adults. However, the only reliable features to distinguish adults of both species are on the genitalia (see table below). Both species can hybridize. The genitalic structure of hybrids is unknown.

Distribution
S. zeamais occurs throughout warm, humid regions around the world, especially in locations where maize is
grown, including: Polynesia, Brazil, Argentina, Burma, Cambodia, Greece, Japan, Morocco, Spain,
Syria, Turkey, United States, USSR, Sub Saharan Africa and Yugoslavia. It is also widely distributed throughout agricultural areas of northern Australia. This species has also been recorded in Canada, in the provinces of Ontario and Quebec, and has been intercepted at ports, but is not well established there. It has, however, been present for several years in Montreal, where grain from the U.S. is stored.

Life cycle
The complete development time for the life cycle of this species averages 36 days. The female chews through the surface of the grain, creating a hole. She then deposits a small oval white egg, and covers the hole as the ovipositor is removed, with a waxy secretion that creates a plug. The plug quickly hardens, and leaves a small raised area on the seed surface. This provides the only visible evidence that the kernel is infested. Only one egg is laid inside each grain. When the egg hatches into a white, legless grub, it will remain inside and begin feeding on the grain. The larvae will pupate while inside, then chew a circular exit hole, and emerge as an adult beetle. A single female may lay 300 to 400 eggs during her lifetime. Adults can live for 5 to 8 months.

When the adults emerge, the females move to a high surface and release sex pheromones. Males are then attracted to this pheromone.

Host range
The maize weevil commonly attacks standing crops, in particular, maize before harvest, and is also commonly associated with rice. It infests raw or processed cereals such as wheat, oats, barley, sorghum, rye and buckwheat. It can breed in crops with a moisture content of a much wider range than S. oryzae, and has been found in fruit, such as apples during storage. Although the maize weevil cannot readily breed in finely processed grains, it can easily breed in products such as macaroni and noodles, and milled cereals that have been exposed to excessive moisture.

Damage and detection

Early detection of infestation is difficult. As S. zeamais larvae feed on the interior of individual grains, often leaving only the hulls, a flour-like grain dust, mixed with frass is evident. Infested grains contain holes through which adults have emerged. A possible indication of infestation is grain, when placed in water, floating to the surface. Ragged holes in individual grains, similar to damage caused by the rice weevil and granary weevil, may indicate infestation. In large stores of grain, an increase in temperature may be detected. The most obvious sign of infestation is the emergence of adults. One study recorded, 5 weeks after infestation, the emergence of 100 adults per kg per day.

See also
 Granary weevil, also known as the wheat weevil (S. granarius)
 Rice weevil (S. oryzae)
 Home stored product entomology
 Invasive species
 List of common household pests
 Pest control

References

Further reading
Proctor, D.L. 1971. An additional aedeagal character for distinguishing Sitophilus zeamais Motsch. from Sitophilus oryzae (L.) (Coleoptera: Cuculionidae). Journal of Stored Products Research, 6: 351–352.
Peng, W.K., Lin, H.C., Wang, C.H. 2003. DNA identification of two laboratory colonies of the weevils, Sitophilus oryzae (L.) and S. zeamais Motschulsky (Coleoptera: Curculionidae) in Taiwan. Journal of Stored Products Research, 39(2): 225–235.
Meikle, W.G., Holst, N., Markham, R.H. 1999. Population simulation model of Sitophilus zeamais (Coleoptera: Curculionidae) in grains stores in West Africa. Environmental Entomology, 28(5): 836–844.
Nardon, C, Nardon, P. 2002. New characters to distinguish larvae and adults of the two sibling species: Sitophilus oryzae(L.) and S. zeamais Mots. (Coleoptera, Dryophthoridae). Annales de la Societe
Meagher, R.L., Reed, C., Mills, R.B. 1982. Development of Sitophilus zeamais and Tribolium castaneum in whole, cracked, and ground pearl millet. Journal of the Kansas Entomological Society, 55(1): 91–94.
Maceljski, M., Korunić, Z. 1973. Contribution to the morphology and ecology of Sitophilus zeamais Motsch. in Yugoslavia. Journal of Stored Products Research, 9: 225–234.
Mason, L.J. (2003). Grain Insect Fact Sheet, E-237-W: Rice, Granary, and Maize Weevils Sitophilu soryzae (L.), S. granarius (L.), and S. zeamais (Motsch). Purdue University
Danho, M., Gaspar, C., Haubruge, E. 2002. The impact of grain quantity on the biology of Sitophilus zeamais Motschulsky (Coleoptera: Curculionidae): oviposition, distribution of eggs, adult emergence, body weight and sex ratio. Journal of Stored Products Research, 38(3): 259–266.
Anonymous. 2009b. Maize weevil Sitophilus zeamais (Motsch.) Canadian Grain Commission.

External links
 Images
 USDA study on temperature management of the maize weevil
 USDA study on contest behaviour of maize weevil larvae when competing within seeds
 African Journal of Biotechnology: Laboratory evaluation of four medicinal plants as protectants against the maize weevil

Dryophthorinae
Agricultural pest insects
Beetles described in 1855
Beetles of South America
storage pests
Insect pests of millets